Hystricosoma is a genus of annelids belonging to the family Aeolosomatidae.

The species of this genus are found in Europe.

Species:

Hystricosoma chappuisi 
Hystricosoma insularum 
Hystricosoma pictum

References

Annelids